The Royal Society Te Apārangi (in full, Royal Society of New Zealand Te Apārangi) is an independent, statutory not-for-profit body in New Zealand providing funding and policy advice in the fields of sciences and the humanities.

History
The Royal Society of New Zealand was founded in 1867 as the New Zealand Institute, a successor to the New Zealand Society, which had been founded by Sir George Grey in 1851. The Institute, established by the New Zealand Institute Act 1867, was an apex organisation in science, with the Auckland Institute, the Wellington Philosophical Society, the Philosophical Institute of Canterbury, and the Westland Naturalists' and Acclimatization Society as constituents. It later included the Otago Institute and other similar organisations. The Colonial Museum (later to become the Dominion Museum and then the Museum of New Zealand Te Papa Tongarewa), which had been established two years earlier, in 1865, was granted to the New Zealand Institute. Publishing transactions and proceedings was one of the Institute's initial functions. James Hector was the Manager of the Institute and the Director of the Colonial Museum and Geological Survey from 1867 until his retirement in 1903.

In 1933, the Institute's name was changed to Royal Society of New Zealand, in reference to the Royal Society of London, a move requiring royal assent and a subsequent Act of Parliament. In 2010, the organisation's remit was expanded to include the social sciences and the humanities.

In 2007, Te Apārangi (Māori for "group of experts") was added to its name, and in 2017, its sesquicentenary, this was shortened to Royal Society Te Apārangi. Its legal name, as defined in legislation, remains Royal Society of New Zealand.

Goals
Constituted under the Royal Society of New Zealand Act 1997 (amended in 2012), the Society exists to:
 Foster in the New Zealand community a culture that supports science and technology, including (without limitation): (i) The promotion of public awareness, knowledge, and understanding of science and technology; and (ii) The advancement of science and technology education,
 Encourage, promote, and recognise excellence in science and technology,
 Provide an infrastructure and other support for the professional needs and development of scientists and technologists,
 Provide expert advice on important public issues to the Government and the community,
 Do all other lawful things which the Council considers conducive to the advancement and promotion of science and technology in New Zealand.

It is a federation of 49 scientific and technological organisations and several affiliate organisations, and also has individual members.

Activities
The Society's activities include:

 Science funding – as a non-political funding distribution agency for government funding, particularly in science research and science education. The Society administers the contestable Marsden fund for 'blue skies' research. Since 2010 the Society has run the annual Rutherford Discovery Fellowships, supporting ten early to mid-career researchers for a five year term. In 2021 a one-off round of thirty post-doctoral fellowships, the MBIE Science Whitinga Fellowships, was announced, to be administered by the Society.
 Publishing – peer-reviewed journals such as NZ Journal of Botany and NZ Journal of Zoology
 Meetings and seminars – most local branches and constituent scientific and technological organisations run seminar series of some description; the Society promotes these and coordinates touring international lecturers
 Awards and medals – including:
Rutherford Medal (formerly the Gold Medal) – awarded annually for exceptional contributions to the advancement and promotion of public awareness, knowledge and understanding in addition to eminent research or technological practice by a person or group in any field of science, mathematics, social science, or technology
 Fleming Award – awarded triennially to recognise protection of New Zealand's environment
 Hector Medal – awarded annually for outstanding work in chemical, physical or mathematical and information sciences by a researcher in New Zealand
Hutton Medal – Earth, plant and animal sciences award for outstanding work by a researcher in New Zealand, awarded annually.
 Pickering Medal – awarded annually to recognise people who have made outstanding contributions to New Zealand society and culture in science, mathematics, social science, and technology. 
Te Rangi Hiroa Medal – awarded for work in social sciences
 Science education – promotes quality science education and plays a role in setting the national science curriculum

The Society administers the Prime Minister's Science Prizes.

As part of its 150th anniversary celebrations, the Society published a series of 150 biographies of women who had contributed to knowledge in New Zealand, called "150 women in 150 words".

Statement on climate change
On 10 July 2008, the Society released a statement on climate change that said, in summary:
The globe is warming because of increasing greenhouse gas emissions. Measurements show that greenhouse gas concentrations in the atmosphere are well above levels seen for many thousands of years. Further global climate changes are predicted, with impacts expected to become more costly as time progresses. Reducing future impacts of climate change will require substantial reductions of greenhouse gas emissions.

Controversy

In 2021, a report by a working group appointed by the New Zealand government proposed changes to the school curriculum to ensure indigenous knowledge (or mātauranga Māori) was given the same status as Western science. In response to this report, seven prominent academics co-authored a letter "In Defence of Science" to the current affairs magazine New Zealand Listener. The letter claimed mātauranga Māori falls "short of what can be defined as science itself", and that placing indigenous knowledge on the same level of science would patronise and fail indigenous populations. Instead, they proposed ensuring that everyone had the opportunity to participate in the world's scientific enterprises.
 
The Royal Society's response was to launch an investigation into two of the co-authors of the letter, who happened to be fellows of the Society. This investigation was criticised by several others fellows, who threatened to resign if they were disciplined. University of Auckland literature professor Brian Boyd criticised what he described as the "knee jerk" reaction to the Listener letter and described the view that mātauranga Māori be protected and only transmitted by Māori as contrary to the principles of universities and the Royal Society. Massey University chemistry professor Peter Schwerdtfeger criticised the Royal Society's investigation as shameful and urged them to be open to debate and discussion. New Zealand Free Speech Union spokesperson Jonathan Ayling argued that the pursuit of science depends on free speech and accused the Royal Society of "abandoning its own heritage and tradition of academic freedom."

Presidents

The list below shows all presidents of the Royal Society of New Zealand, known as the New Zealand Institute from 1867 to 1933, and since 2017 as the Royal Society Te Apārangi.

Fellows

The Academy Executive Committee of the Society from time to time elects as a Fellow of the Royal Society of New Zealand any person who in its opinion "has achieved distinction in research or the advancement of science, technology or the humanities." The number of Fellows is limited to such number as is agreed from time to time between the Academy Executive Committee and the Council of the Society. A Fellow is entitled to use, in connection with his or her name, either the letters FRSNZ, which stand for Fellow of the Royal Society of New Zealand, or such other letters or title as is agreed from time to time between the Academy Executive Committee and the Council. The first female fellow, Kathleen Curtis, was elected in 1936.

Chief executive 
Di McCarthy was Chief Executive from 2007 to 2014. Andrew Cleland led from 2014 until his retirement in 2021. Cindy Kiro was appointed Chief Executive from 1 March 2021. In July 2021 it was announced that Paul Atkins, Chief Executive of Zealandia, will be taking over from Cindy Kiro on 29 November.

Constituent organisations
The Society has both individual and organisational members. Constituent Organisations help the Society identify and address issues relevant to the research, knowledge and innovation sectors, and link into the research information and activities that the Society undertakes. These constituent organisations are:

Regional Constituent Organisations
Regional Constituent Organisations (branches) are geographical constituents and include:
Auckland Museum Institute (formerly the Auckland Institute), the membership body of Auckland War Memorial Museum
Hawkes Bay Branch of the Royal Society of New Zealand
Nelson Science Society
Otago Institute for the Arts and Sciences
Royal Society of New Zealand Canterbury Branch
Royal Society of New Zealand Manawatu Branch Incorporated (formerly the 'Manawatu Philosophical Society')
Royal Society of New Zealand Rotorua Branch
Royal Society of New Zealand Wellington Branch (formerly the 'Wellington Philosophical Society')
The Waikato Branch of the Royal Society of New Zealand
Wanaka Branch of the Royal Society of New Zealand

Affiliate Organisations
The Society includes Affiliate Organisations that cover a diversity of disciplines, including policy, science education and the museum sector:
Otago Museum
Environmental Protection Authority 
House of Science (HoS NZ Charitable Trust)
International Institute of Refrigeration (NZ National Cttee)
Medical Research Institute of New Zealand
Motu Economic and Public Policy Research
National Science-Technology Roadshow Trust
New Zealand Association of Economists
New Zealand Association Impact Assessment
Statistics Research Associates Ltd
Te Manawa: Science Centre/Manawatu Museum
Water New Zealand

References

External links
 Home page
 Royal Society of New Zealand Act 1997
 New Zealand Journal of Botany at SCImago Journal Rank
 New Zealand Journal of Botany at HathiTrust Digital Library
 New Zealand Journal of Botany at Botanical Scientific Journals

 
1867 establishments in New Zealand
Scientific organizations established in 1867
Members of the International Council for Science
Members of the International Science Council
Organisations based in New Zealand with royal patronage